The 2014–15 UC Irvine Anteaters men's basketball team represented the University of California, Irvine during the 2014–15 NCAA Division I men's basketball season. The Anteaters were led by fifth year head coach Russell Turner and played their home games at the Bren Events Center. They were members of the Big West Conference. They finished the season 21–13, 11–5 in Big West play to finish in a tie for second place. They defeated UC Riverside, UC Santa Barbara, and Hawaii to become champions of the Big West tournament. They received an automatic bid to the NCAA tournament, their first tournament bid in school history, where they lost in the second round to Louisville.

Off-Season

2014 Recruiting Class

Roster

Schedule
Source
Source
Source
Source

|-
!colspan=9 style="background:#002244; color:#FFDE6C;"|  Exhibition

|-
!colspan=9 style="background:#002244; color:#FFDE6C;"| Regular season

|-
!colspan=9 style="background:#002244; color:#FFDE6C;"| Big West tournament

|-
!colspan=9 style="background:#002244; color:#FFDE6C;"| NCAA tournament

References

UC Irvine
UC Irvine Anteaters men's basketball seasons
UC Irvine
UC Irvine Anteaters
UC Irvine Anteaters